Jola Sigmond (born September 2, 1943) is a Swedish 
architect SAR. He was born in Budapest, Hungary, and came to Sweden as a fugitive in 1967 where he studied architecture at Lund University in Lund. His intelligence quotient is stated to be 192, and he creates IQ assessments.

Notes

1943 births
Living people
Architects from Budapest
Swedish architects